The 2015 I-League 2nd Division was the eighth season of the I-League 2nd Division, the second division of football in India. Eight clubs participated this season, including Mohammedan, after they were relegated from the I-League last season. Aizawl F.C. won the league and will be the first team from Mizoram to play in I-League in 2015–16 I-League season.

Venues

The double-leg league was held in two venues  Kanchenjunga Stadium, Siliguri and SSB Ranidanga Stadium, Golaghat respectively.
The initial seven rounds of matches were held in Siliguri, the return legs were held in Golaghat.

Team overview

Location and coaches

League table

Results

References

External links
 Table, Fixtures, and Results at I-League website.

I-League 2nd Division seasons
3